Ker or KER may refer to:

People
 Ker (surname)
 Ker, family name of the Dukes of Roxburghe
 Ker, a spelling of the Guo surname
 Frederick Ker, the appellant in the U.S. Supreme Court case Ker v. Illinois
 Ker, a clan of the Bharwad people

Mathematics
 Ker or ker is an abbreviation of kernel
 Ker is one of the Kelvin functions

Other uses
 County Kerry, Ireland, Chapman code KER
 Kinetic energy recovery, see kinetic energy recovery system
 Ker, Azerbaijan, a village
Capparis decidua, or ker, a tree and fruit used in various Indian cuisines
 Ayatollah Hashemi Rafsanjani Airport in Kerman, Iran (KER IATA airport code) 
 Ker, singular of Keres (mythology)
 Ker, a character in Battlefield Earth
 Ker (tribe), of Kutch, India
 VIXX 2016 Conception Ker, an album by South Korean band VIXX
 Ker, female death-spirits in Greek mythology. See Keres

See also
 Kerr (disambiguation)
 Keir (disambiguation)
 Kher (disambiguation)